Çobanabdallı (also, Çoban Abdallı and Chobanabdally) is a village and municipality in the Samukh Rayon of Azerbaijan.  It has a population of 2,433.

References 

Populated places in Samukh District